Sharifabad (also Romanized as Sharīfābād) is a village in Emamzadeh Abdol Aziz Rural District, Jolgeh District, Isfahan County, Isfahan Province, Iran. At the 2006 census, its population was 553, in 152 families.

References 

Populated places in Isfahan County